The Mouth of a Cave is an oil-on-canvas painting by French artist Hubert Robert, created in 1784. The painting is in the collection of the Metropolitan Museum of Art, in New York.

Description
The Mouth of a Cave was painted by Robert as part of a set of six paintings for the younger brother of Louis XVI. The work was at one point damaged by water, though it was later restored.

The subject is likely to be inspired by the Grotta del Tuono in the Gulf of Naples. The Posillipo tunnel has also been suggested as a possible source of inspiration.

See also
 The Bathing Pool, one of the other paintings of the set

References

1784 paintings
Paintings by Hubert Robert
Paintings in the collection of the Metropolitan Museum of Art